Mark M. Phillips (born March 31, 1951) is an American astronomer who works on the observational studies of all classes of supernovae. He has worked on SN 1986G, SN 1987A, the Calán/Tololo Supernova Survey, the High-Z Supernova Search Team, and  the Phillips relationship. This relationship has allowed the use of Type Ia supernovae as standard candles, leading to the precise measurements of the Hubble constant H0 and the deceleration parameter q0, the latter implying the existence of dark energy or a cosmological constant in the Universe.

He is the past director of Cerro Tololo Inter-American Observatory of the National Optical Astronomy Observatory and is the Associate Director and Carnegie Staff Member at Las Campanas Observatory in Chile, part of the Observatories of the Carnegie Institution for Science.

He received his undergraduate degree in Astronomy from San Diego State University in 1973, and his Ph.D., also in Astronomy & Astrophysics in 1977, from the University of California, Santa Cruz and Lick Observatory where he was a student of Professor Donald Osterbrock. After graduate school, he was a postdoc at CTIO, then at Anglo-Australian Observatory, moving back to Chile in 1982 to become a staff astronomer at CTIO.

In addition to his work on supernovae, he has also worked extensively on the spectroscopic studies of Active Galactic Nuclei.

References

External links

 Lick Observatory page
 University of California Observatories page
 Mark M. Phillips, directory page at the IAU

1951 births
20th-century American astronomers
21st-century American astronomers
Living people
University of California, Santa Cruz alumni